Seaford is an unincorporated community in York County, Virginia, United States, on the Virginia Peninsula.  As of the 2010 Census, the Seaford postal area (ZIP Code 23696) had a population of 3,669.

History
John Chisman patented  on Crab Neck in 1636 and began the Seaford Settlement. The area was originally called Crab Neck, Crab Rock and Calamar.  The Crab Neck post office was established in 1889 and changed its name to Seaford in 1910. The community has remained small over the years and includes many waterfront properties.

Summary
Seaford is mostly a rural area and includes Seaford Road and the roads attached to it. There are different neighborhoods within Seaford, some of these include Port Meyers, Sommerville, and Cheadle Loop. Seaford is located on multiple creeks including Chisman Creek and Back Creek, both of which lead out to the York River, which eventually takes you to the Chesapeake Bay. Most people in Seaford work in the surrounding areas such as, Newport News, Hampton, and Williamsburg.

Schooling
Children living in Seaford and the smaller adjacent Dandy attend Seaford Elementary School. Seaford Elementary School is located on Seaford road and is for Kindergarten through fifth grade. After completing the fifth grade, all Seaford elementary students attend Yorktown Middle School for grades sixth through eighth, which is located on Route 17 in Yorktown, near the historical village. Then they will go on to attend York High School for grades ninth through twelfth grade.

Religion
There are multiple Christian churches located in Seaford. These churches include the Zion United Methodist Church , the Seaford Baptist Church , and The Seaford Church of Christ .

Economy
Many of the businesses located in Seaford are related to its close proximity to the Chesapeake Bay and other tributaries.  Some of these businesses include Calvin Hudgins Welding , Lighthouse Marine Surveying and Consulting, Mill's Marina,Seaford Scallop Company,Seaford Country Market, a Coca-Cola Distributor and Smith's Marine Railway. Smith's Marine Railway has been in continuous operation by the Smith family since 1842. The Seaford Country Market closed for a number of years and then acquired new owners and reopened for business. They serve different hot food items such as pizzas and sandwiches. There are groceries items such as milk and flour and snack foods. There is beer, ice, and non-alcoholic beverages for sale. They also have ice cream, candy, and pre-packaged deserts.

References 

Smith's Marine Railway
Virginia Cities/Seaford
York County Schools

External links 
York County Virginia Local Government

Unincorporated communities in York County, Virginia
Unincorporated communities in Virginia
Virginia populated places on the Chesapeake Bay